Patricia M. Cast (born November 16, 1966) is an American actress. She is best known for her portrayal of Nina Webster on the CBS soap opera The Young and the Restless.

Career
 
Cast came to prominence on the television series The Bad News Bears in 1979 as Amanda Whirlitzer, the role originated by Tatum O'Neal in the 1976 film of the same name. After years of acting in television films, she starred with Jason Bateman as his sister on the television series It's Your Move. This performance led to a short stint on the soap opera Santa Barbara.

In 1986, Cast began her most notable role, Nina Webster on the soap opera The Young and the Restless, where she was reunited with her good friend and Bad News Bears co-star, Kristoff St. John. In 1992, she won a Daytime Emmy Award for her portrayal. Cast went on to reveal in 1993 that she only expected her role to be short term on the soap opera. In September 2000, it was announced that Cast had requested to be released from her contract, leading to much speculation as to why she chose to leave. Cast's publicist later issued a statement, saying: "Tricia has decided to take a sabbatical from Hollywood for an indefinite period of time. She is looking forward to spending some quality time with her new husband in Tennessee." She made her last appearance on January 31, 2001. In 2008, it was announced that Cast would be returning for several guest appearances along with various other previous actors, airing from November 14 to 20, 2008. In April 2009, Cast was announced to be reprising the role again for an extended run, remaining on a recurring status with the soap opera for the next three years. In 2011, she was nominated for another Daytime Emmy Award in a different category.

Personal life
Cast was married to Jack Allocco, a composer for The Young and the Restless and The Bold and the Beautiful, from 1989 to 2000. On July 20, 2000, Cast married Bat McGrath and they remained married until his death in 2019.

Filmography

Television

Film

References

External links

1966 births
Actresses from New York (state)
American child actresses
American soap opera actresses
Daytime Emmy Award winners
Daytime Emmy Award for Outstanding Younger Actress in a Drama Series winners
Living people
People from Medford, New York
21st-century American women